The two , WAB 47/1 & 47/2, are elegies composed by Anton Bruckner in 1852.

History 
Bruckner composed these two motets in 1852 for the funeral of his friend Josef Seiberl.

The two Totenlieder were first published in band II/2, pp. 141–144 of the Göllerich/Auer biography.

Text

Music 
The works are scored for  choir a cappella. The first setting in E-flat major is 10-bar long. The second setting in F major is 19-bar long.

Discography 

There are a few recordings of the Totenlieder:
 Jürgen Jürgens, Monteverdi-Chor, Bruckner - Music of St Florian Period (II) - CD: BSVD-0111 (Bruckner Archive), 1985 - only the first Totenlied 
 Duncan Ferguson, Choir of St. Mary's Cathedral of Edinburgh, Bruckner: Motets  – CD: Delphian Records DCD34071, 2010
 Thomas Kerbl, Chorvereinigung Bruckner 2011, Anton Bruckner Lieder/Magnificat – CD: LIVA 046, 2011
 Philipp von Steinäcker, Vocalensemble Musica Saeculorum, Bruckner: Pange lingua - Motetten - CD: Fra Bernardo FB 1501271, 2015
 Łukasz Borowicz, Anton Bruckner: Requiem, RIAS Kammerchor Berlin, Akademie für Alte Musik Berlin – CD: Accentus ACC30474, 2019

References

Sources 
 August Göllerich, Anton Bruckner. Ein Lebens- und Schaffens-Bild,  – posthumous edited by Max Auer by G. Bosse, Regensburg, 1932
 Anton Bruckner – Sämtliche Werke, Band XXI: Kleine Kirchenmusikwerke, Musikwissenschaftlicher Verlag der Internationalen Bruckner-Gesellschaft, Hans Bauernfeind and Leopold Nowak (Editor), Vienna, 1984/2001
 Cornelis van Zwol, Anton Bruckner 1824–1896 – Leven en werken, uitg. Thoth, Bussum, Netherlands, 2012.

External links 
 
 
  - Totenlied No.1
  - Totenlied No.2 
 Totenlied Es-Dur, WAB 47 and Totenlied F-Dur, WAB 48 Critical discography by Hans Roelofs 

Motets by Anton Bruckner
1852 compositions
Compositions in E-flat major
Compositions in F major